Mancinella echinata, common names prickly rock shell, prickly rock snail, is a species of sea snail, a marine gastropod mollusk, in the family Muricidae, the murex snails or rock snails.

References

echinata
Gastropods described in 1832